Baldwin Peak is a peak between Lilienthal Glacier and Mount Berry in northern Graham Land. It was photographed by the Falkland Islands and Dependencies Aerial Survey Expedition in 1956–57 and mapped from these photos by the Falkland Islands Dependencies Survey. It was named by the UK Antarctic Place-Names Committee in 1960 for Thomas Scott Baldwin, American inventor of the vent opening which gives control and stability to parachutes.

Further reading 
 Damien Gildea, Mountaineering in Antarctica: complete guide: Travel guide

External References 

 Baldwin Peak on USGS website
 Baldwin Peak on AADC website
  Baldwin Peak on SCAR website
 satelight image of the Baldwin Peak area
 long term updated weather for the Baldwin Peak area

References
 

Mountains of Graham Land
Nordenskjöld Coast